Bjørnør is a former municipality in the old Sør-Trøndelag county in Norway.  The  municipality existed from 1838 until 1892 in what was at that time the United Kingdoms of Sweden and Norway.  It encompassed the area of what is now the municipality of Osen along with the Roan and Stoksund areas in the present day municipality of Åfjord, all in the western part of the Fosen peninsula in Trøndelag county.  Bjørnør bordered the municipality of Aafjord to the south and Nordre Trondhjem county to the north and west.  The administrative centre of the municipality was the village of Roan where the Roan Church is located.

History
The municipality of Bjørnør was established on 1 January 1838 (see formannskapsdistrikt).  On 15 January 1892, the King approved a royal resolution to split up the municipality of Bjørør.  It went into effect on 1 June 1892 when Bjørnør ceased to exist, and it was split into three new municipalities: Osen (population: 1,575), Roan (population: 2,069), and Stoksund (population: 1,122).

Name
The municipality (originally the parish) is named Bjørnør after the historic name for the area. The first element plural genitive case of the word  which means "bear".

Government
During its existence, this municipality was governed by a municipal council of elected representatives, which in turn elected a mayor.

Mayors
The mayors of Bjørnør:

 1838–1839: Tarald Eide
 1840–1841: Mathias Eide
 1842–1845: Christian Severin Houge
 1846–1851: Mathias Eide
 1852–1864: Peder Pedersen
 1864–1865: Ole Wilmann
 1866–1883: Fredrik Berg (H)
 1883-1883: Jakob Kristian Sørmelan (V)
 1884–1885: Johan Moses Møller (H)
 1886–1888: Harald Kjeldsberg 
 1888–1889: Jens Larsen Hopstad 
 1890–1891: Johan Moses Møller (H)
 1892-1892: John Hopstad (MV)

See also
List of former municipalities of Norway

References

Osen
Roan, Norway
Åfjord
Former municipalities of Norway
1838 establishments in Norway
1892 disestablishments in Norway